Starmaster is a video game written for the Atari 2600 by Alan Miller and published  in June 1982 by Activision. The game is similar to Atari 8-bit family game Star Raiders. Starmaster was not ported to other systems, but has been re-released in collections such as Activision Anthology.

Miller programmed other Atari 2600 games for Activision including Ice Hockey and Robot Tank.

Gameplay

The opening jingle of Starmaster features Also sprach Zarathustra, which was  used as the theme for 2001: A Space Odyssey. The player pilots a starfighter, with the purpose of destroying a number of enemy ships before they destroy four friendly starbases. Gameplay is presented mostly in first-person cockpit view.

The starfighter carries laser weapons, shields, and a faster-than-light drive. The fighter also carries a limited energy supply, which is drained by firing the lasers, being hit by enemy fire, warping, or simply flying around. If the ship's energy drops to zero it is destroyed, and the game ends. Enemy fire can knock out the fighter's subsystems (such as weapons) on top of draining energy.

The game universe is a square-shaped galaxy mapped into a grid of 36 sectors. Each sector can be home to some enemy ships, a starbase, both, or nothing. The player "warps" the fighter to a sector to engage enemy ships; once they are all destroyed, the player moves on to another. The player can also warp to a sector with a starbase, and dock with it (a rather tricky process) to replenish energy and repair damaged subsystems. Enemy ships in turn maneuver through the galaxy as they home in to destroy the starbases.

The "BW/Color" control on the console is used to switch between the sector map and the cockpit views, instead of its usual function. The "Select" switch simply adjusts the number of enemy ships at the start of the game. The "Skill" switches have no function.

The game is won when all enemy ships are destroyed or lost if the player's fighter is destroyed or runs out of fuel.

Ship status

The game displays a tactical readout of the player's ship status. A radar screen displays the relative position of enemies and other objects. The following symbols signify damage to a ship's systems, which could have any or all of the following effects:

L: Laser cannons destroyed. The player cannot fire at the enemy or meteors. 
S: Shields destroyed. The player's ship is defenseless. One more hit from enemy fire or collision with a meteor during warp travel will destroy the ship and end the game. 
W: Warp engines are damaged. The player's ship will use twice as much energy during warp travel. Watch energy reserves. 
R: Radar destroyed. The player can no longer spot enemy fighters on the Galactic Chart. Starbases will continue to appear.

The game uses color to inform the player of the game's action: a red explosion occurs when an enemy ship is destroyed, a blue explosion occurs when the player destroys incoming enemy fire, and a yellow explosion results when the player's ship is hit by enemy fire.

Scoring
At the end of a game, the player's score is calculated using the following formula:

Base is the score set at the start of the mission.
Ensign: 3100
Leader: 4300
Wing Commander: 5700
StarMaster: 7000
E: For each enemy starfighter destroyed: 100
S: For each unit of stardate that has passed: minus 1
D: Each time the player's ship is docked to a starbase for refueling and repairs: minus 100
B: Each starbase destroyed by enemy: minus 500

Patches
Players could earn embroidered patches by photographing their television screens with a certain score and mailing the picture to the company. To join the "Order of the Supreme Starmaster," players would need to reach the following levels:

Ensign: 3800
Leader: 5700
Wing Commander: 7600
StarMaster: 9000

Reception
Video magazine's "1982 Guide to Electronic Games" described Starmaster as "the best space-piloting game cartridge ever created for a programmable video-game system".

Richard A. Edwards reviewed Starmaster in The Space Gamer No. 55. Edwards commented that "Starmaster is very similar to the Atari 400/800 game Star Raiders. Its graphics are perhaps not quite as good, but the sound and color keys are better, and best of all, it can be played on the Atari VCS.  Pick this one up."

See also

List of Atari 2600 games
List of Activision games: 1980–1999
Star Raiders

References

External links
 Starmaster at Atari Mania
 Starmaster at AtariAge
 

1982 video games
Activision games
Atari 2600 games
Atari 2600-only games
Space combat simulators
Video game clones
Video games developed in the United States